Stanovsko is a settlement in the Municipality of Poljčane in northeastern Slovenia. It is a dispersed settlement in the hills northwest of Poljčane. The area is part of the traditional region of Styria. It is now included with the rest of the municipality in the Drava Statistical Region.

References

External links
Stanovsko on Geopedia

Populated places in the Municipality of Poljčane